In fluid dynamics, the Froude–Krylov force—sometimes also called the Froude–Kriloff force—is a hydrodynamical force named after William Froude and Alexei Krylov. The Froude–Krylov force is the force introduced by the unsteady pressure field generated by undisturbed waves. The Froude–Krylov force does, together with the diffraction force, make up the total non-viscous forces acting on a floating body in regular waves. The diffraction force is due to the floating body disturbing the waves.

Formulas 

The Froude–Krylov force can be calculated from:

where
 is the Froude–Krylov force,
 is the wetted surface of the floating body,
 is the pressure in the undisturbed waves and
 the body's normal vector pointing into the water.

In the simplest case the formula may be expressed as the product of the wetted surface area (A) of the floating body, and the dynamic pressure acting from the waves on the body:

The dynamic pressure, close to the surface, is given by:

where
 is the sea water density (approx. 1030 kg/m3)
 is the acceleration due to the earth's gravity (9.81 m/s2)
 is the wave height from crest to trough.

See also 
 Response Amplitude Operator

References 
 

Shipbuilding
Naval architecture
Fluid dynamics